Mag, MAG, Mags or mags may refer to:

Arts, entertainment and media
 MAG (video game), released in 2010
 Mág (film), a 1988 Czech film
 Mag (Slovenian magazine), published from 1995 to 2010
 The Mag, a British music magazine

Businesses and organisations
 MacKenzie Art Gallery, Regina, Saskatchewan, Canada
 Manchester Airport Holdings, trading as MAG, a British holding company
 Maricopa Association of Governments, the regional agency for the greater Maricopa region in Arizona, U.S.
 Mines Advisory Group, a non-governmental organization
 Motorcycle Action Group, a British motorcyclists' rights group
 MAG motorcycle engines, manufactured by Motosacoche
 Hungarian General Machine Factory (MÁG), a former automobile and aircraft manufacturer

Military
 a United States Marine Corps aviation group
 FN MAG, a machine gun

People
 Mag Bodard (1916–2019), Italian-born French film producer
 Mags Darcy (born 1987), Irish camogie player
 Mags McCarthy (born 1989 or 1990), Irish country music singer
 Mags Murray (1961–2020), Irish politician
 Mags Portman (1974–2019), British medical doctor
 Gallus Mag, nickname of a notorious 19th century female bouncer in New York City
 Mags, stage name of Magne Furuholmen (born 1962), Norwegian musician and visual artist

Places
 Mag, a village near Săliște, Sibiu County, Romania
 Mag (river)
 Madagascar, UNDP country code MAG

Science and technology
 MAG (cipher), a stream cipher algorithm
 Magnesium alloy wheels, commonly called "mags"
 Magnetometer, sometimes abbreviated "mag"
 Magnitude (astronomy), abbreviated "mag" as a measure of brightness of an object in the sky
 Male accessory gland, in human biology
 Maximum Absorbency Garment, a diaper-like garment worn by astronauts
 Metal active gas welding
 Myelin-associated glycoprotein

Other uses
 Mount Albert Grammar School (MAGS), Auckland, New Zealand
 Magnology, or The MAG, a community convention in Germany
 Hag and Mag, demons in Mandaeism
 Men's artistic gymnastics
 Madang Airport, Papua New Guinea, IATA airport code MAG
 Mag., an abbreviation of Magister
 MAG mini truck, a captive import utility truck better known as the Hafei Ruiyi

See also
 Magazine (disambiguation)
 Maggie (disambiguation)

Given names
Hypocorisms
Lists of people by nickname